Cass Township is one of twenty-six townships in Fulton County, Illinois, USA.  As of the 2010 census, its population was 622 and it contained 271 housing units.

Geography

Cities, towns, villages
Smithfield

Unincorporated towns
Buckeye
Poverty Ridge
(This list is based on USGS data and may include former settlements.)
Totten Prairie
Gobbler's Knob
Travis was an old town site near Poverty Ridge which was near seville and the old fuller mill. It is said that the foundation of the mill can still be found. Travis did not become nothing but an old forgotten town site which never organized.

Cemeteries
The township contains these six cemeteries: Baughman, Buckeye, Fuller, Henderson, Howard and Sinnett Chapel.

Major highways
 Illinois Route 95

Demographics

School districts
Community Unit School District 3 Fulton City

Political districts
Illinois's 17th congressional district
State House District 94
State Senate District 47

References
 
United States Census Bureau 2007 TIGER/Line Shapefiles
United States Board on Geographic Names (GNIS)
United States National Atlas

External links
City-Data.com
Illinois State Archives

Townships in Fulton County, Illinois
Townships in Illinois